Madeline Faith Kripke (September 9, 1943 – April 25, 2020) was an American book collector who held one of the world's largest collections of dictionaries.

Early life and education
Madeline Kripke was born on September 9, 1943, in New London, Connecticut, to mother Dorothy Karp Kripke and father Myer S. Kripke, a rabbi. Kripke's brother was philosopher Saul Kripke, and her sister was Netta Kripke Stern, a social worker. She graduated with a bachelor's in English from Barnard College.

Dictionary collection and career
In fifth grade, she recalled receiving a Webster’s Collegiate Dictionary from her parents, which she said "unlocked the world for me". Kripke acquired a collection of approximately 20,000 dictionaries in her two-bedroom apartment. The oldest dictionary in her collection was a Latin dictionary published in 1502 by Ambrogio Calepino. She placed a special emphasis on collecting dictionaries regarding obscure slang. Her collection includes the only known copy of Larks of London (1840), a dictionary of slang from the London underworld. Simon Winchester said that her collection of slang dictionaries represented "the very living and breathing edge of the English language". Jesse Sheidlower described her collection as better than that of the Library of Congress. 

After graduating from college, Kripke held several jobs, including as a welfare case worker and a teacher. She eventually became an editor and a publisher, doing copyediting and proofreading. She also worked at several bookstores, eventually becoming a book dealer.

Death
Kripke died from complications of COVID-19 in Manhattan during the COVID-19 pandemic in New York City on April 25, 2020.

Awards and honors
Kripke was a founding member of the Dictionary Society of North America and attended every meeting for nearly forty years. In 2015 she was one of six Fellows elected to the Society, its highest honor, along with Anatoly Liberman and John Simpson. She received their Richard W. Bailey Award for Distinguished Service to Lexicography and Lexicology in 2017.

References

Barnard College alumni
People from New London, Connecticut
2020 deaths
1943 births
American Jews
Book and manuscript collectors
Dictionaries
Deaths from the COVID-19 pandemic in New York (state)
Madeline